Varga is a Canadian metal band that was formed in 1985.  "Freeze Don't Move" and "Greed", from their Prototype album, were minor hits on MuchMusic throughout 1993. Dan Fila and Sean Williamson were later members of Hypodust, an industrial metal band hailing from Hamilton, Ontario.
In 2012 Varga reformed, going back to their progressive metal roots, and released two new full-length albums, Enter The Metal (2013) and Return of the Metal (2014).

History

1985-1992
Varga was formed in Hamilton, Ontario, Canada in 1985. Their first independent cassette, Multiple Wargasms, was released in 1991, garnering positive reviews both locally and internationally, featuring a progressive/thrash metal sound.
In 1992, the band recorded a full-length album for New York independent label Maze America, but the label folded and the CD was never released.

1993-1997
Varga signed with Zoo/BMG in 1993, and released Prototype the following year, introducing some industrial elements to their sound. The band was nominated for a Canadian Juno award for "Best Hard Rock Act", and was one of the first bands to perform live on MuchMusic's Power 30, and toured extensively in the U.S. and Canada. In the U.S. the band's video for "Greed" was picked up on Headbangers Ball, and was featured in an episode of Beavis and Butthead.
In 1995, the band released Oxygen, but with little support from the label, and no hit songs, the band parted ways with BMG, but not before opening for international acts such as White Zombie and Metallica.

1998-2010
After disbanding in 1998, the members continued to perform individually. From 2002 to 2008, Dan Fila and Sean Williamson were members of industrial/metal band "Hypodust". Dan, Sean, and Joe Varga also performed during this time in a classic-metal cover band called "SuperBlaster".

2011-Present
Through social media, the band reconnected with Adam Alex in 2011. It quickly became apparent that the old chemistry was still there, and the band decided to once again enter the studio, with producer Julius Butty (Alexisonfire, Protest The Hero).

Personnel
Joe Varga (Bass & Lead Vocals)
Dan Fila (Drums)
Sean Williamson (Guitar)
Adam Alex (Guitar)

Discography

Albums
Multiple Wargasms (1991)
Prototype (1994)
Oxygen (1995)
Enter The Metal (2013)
Return of the Metal (2014)

Compilation appearances
Raw M.E.A.T. 2 (1990)

External links

References

Musical groups with year of establishment missing
Musical groups from Hamilton, Ontario
Canadian heavy metal musical groups
Musical groups established in 1989
1989 establishments in Ontario